The rectouterine folds, (sacrogenital folds) are folds of the rectouterine pouch.

They contain a considerable amount of fibrous tissue and smooth muscle fibers which are attached to the front of the sacrum and constitute the uterosacral ligaments.

References

External links
  - "The Female Pelvis: Rectouterine"

Pelvis